The University of Silicon Valley (USV) is a private university in San Jose, California, in Silicon Valley. Founded in 1887 as  Cogswell Technical School, and later known as Cogswell Polytechnical College. It was the first technical training institution in the West and one of only two private universities, along with Stanford University, that were originally guaranteed a tax exemption in the Californian Constitution. USV is accredited by the WASC Senior College and University Commission. Programs at Cogswell range from digital media to engineering, with an emphasis on digital animation, audio and music production, and video game design.

History 

The University of Silicon Valley was founded as a high school on March 19, 1887, by Henry D. Cogswell in San Francisco. It opened in August 1888, offering technical classes for boys and business classes for girls. On June 30, 1930, it became a technical college. It was the first technical training institution in the West.

The original campus building was occupied in 1888 in the Mission District in San Francisco. When the 1906 earthquake partially destroyed the campus, the College relocated across the street to an existing home. After the City of San Francisco purchased some of the land by eminent domain in 1917, a new building was constructed at Folsom Street and 26th Street in San Francisco to house the school.

In 1974, having outgrown the existing campus, the college moved to a location at Stockton and California Streets. In 1985, it moved to Cupertino, where it remained until 1994 (its old San Francisco building became a Ritz Carlton hotel). In 1993, the college purchased a campus in Sunnyvale, which it moved to in 1994. This campus was sold in 2012, and in 2015 the college moved to a leased building in San Jose.

Modern history 
In 2010 the college was acquired by Palm Ventures, a private equity firm. The following year Charles "Chuck" House, executive director of the Media X program at Stanford University, became chancellor. Deborah Snyder was appointed president of the college in 2014. As of 2018, the current Chief Executive Officer is Charles Restivo. As a result of the acquisition, the college lost its original property tax exemption as a non-profit institution.

In April 2021, the university formally took the name of "University of Silicon Valley", referring to the local high-technology growth of Silicon Valley.

Academics 

The University of Silicon Valley offers the Bachelor of Arts (B.A.), Bachelor of Science (B.S.), and Master of Arts (M.A.) degrees and specializes in digital animation, video game design and audio & music production

Its computer graphics degree program is the longest-running in the Bay Area. It includes Project X, an invitation-only animated film production course that approximates the experience of interning in the industry, and MediaWorks, an audio-visual concepting and production course, which has been running continuously since 2013. MediaWorks facilitates student learning via national and international collaborations between students and professional organizations in a fast-paced, competitive production setting, imitating the environment and work ethic of the media production industries.

In November 2007, USV announced the addition of a minor in business management. In January 2011 Cogswell started its entrepreneurship program; it expanded this in 2012 into the first Master's program in Entrepreneurship and Innovation.

Campus
The University of Silicon Valley is located in San Jose, California, in Silicon Valley. USV's campus is located in the Innovation Triangle district in North San Jose, near the headquarters of Samsung and Cisco. Student housing is spread across North San Jose.

Student outcomes
According to the College Scorecard, the school has a 42 percent 8-year graduation rate. In 2021, the median salary after attending was $61,619.

Notable alumni
John Oceguera, former Speaker of the Nevada Assembly
Gertrude Boyle Kanno, American sculptor
DJ Qbert, Filipino musician

References

External links 

 Official website

University of Silicon Valley
Educational institutions established in 1887
Schools accredited by the Western Association of Schools and Colleges
Private universities and colleges in California
1887 establishments in California